Birsa Munda Airport  is a domestic airport serving Ranchi, the capital city of the Jharkhand, India. It is named after the famous Indian tribal freedom fighter, Birsa Munda, and is currently managed by Airports Authority of India. The airport sprawls over an area of 1,568 acres. The airport is used by more than 1.2 million passengers annually and is the 19th busiest airport in India.

Terminals

Integrated terminal

The new integrated passenger terminal building at the airport was inaugurated by the then civil aviation minister Ajit Singh on 24 March 2013.

It has four aerobridges and six escalators imported from China, Germany and Singapore. The terminal has a capacity to handle 500 domestic and 200 international passengers at a time.

In March 2013, the tax on aviation turbine fuel sold at the airport was reduced from 20% to 4% to attract more airlines to the city. Overnight parking of aircraft at the airport was made free-of-charge to encourage airlines to schedule their aircraft to remain overnight, so that there may be more early-morning flights to the metro cities. The Airports Authority of India also constructed three more parking bays, thereby making it the first tier-II airport in India to have eight aircraft parking bays. Two new aerobridges were added to the terminal and the runway was extended as well.

Cargo terminal

A new cargo terminal was inaugurated in February 2017 by the then Chief Minister of Jharkhand, Raghubar Das. The terminal can handle 50 metric tonnes (mT) of cargo everyday and is equipped with explosive trace detection equipment, cargo X-ray machines, hardware security machines, and CCTV cameras.

Airlines and destinations

References

External links

 
 

Buildings and structures in Ranchi
Airports in Jharkhand
Transport in Ranchi
Memorials to Birsa Munda
World War II sites in India
Airports with year of establishment missing